Karela United FC is a Ghanaian professional football club based in Aiyinase, Ellembele District, Western Region. The club competed in the 2019 Ghanaian Normalisation Cup Competition.
Karela plays their home matches at the CAM Park.

History 
The club was founded on Tuesday October 1, 2013, when the former Metropolitan Sporting Club changed its name to Karela United Football Club. Karela initially competed in the Ghana Division One league, off which they emerged as champions and were subsequently promoted into the Ghana Premier League in the year 2017. The first official match was played on Saturday November 23, 2013 against Proud United in a goalless draw at Kasoa.

2018 – present 
After the Ghana Premier League was hit by the Anas Number 12 scandal and the 2018 league season was cancelled along with the dissolution of the Ghana Football Association in June 2018, a Normalisation Competition was organised by the GFA normalisation committee to be played in place of the main league as the restructuring of the GFA was being put in place. Karela placed 2nd in group B to qualify for the next stage, beating Ashanti Gold SC at that stage to qualify to the finals to play against Asante Kotoko. Karela lost the finals in a penalty shootout round after the match ended in a 1–1 draw. They lost the bid to represent Ghana at the 2019–20 CAF Champions League and were declared runner-up in the Tier 1 of the competition.

After several distractions to the Ghana premier league from 2017 due to the dissolution of the GFA in June 2018, the 2018 league season was abandoned and the uprising of the deadly COVID-19 pandemic which also caused the 2019-20 league to be cancelled abruptly, the 2020-2021 season started in November 2020.

Rivalry 
Karela being a club based in the Nzema enclave of the Ellembele District located in Western Region of Ghana, they developed a fierce rivalry between them and their fellow Nzema enclave team Medeama SC. The rivalry has developed over the years into the Nzema Derby. They are also rivals with Nzema Kotoko.

Grounds 
The team's home games are played at Crosby Awuah Memorial (CAM) Park.

Current squad

Honours

Domestic 

 Ghana Division One League Zone II
 Champions (1): 2016–17

Club captains 
Philip Quarshie (2016–2018)

Godfred Saka (2018)

Empem Dacosta (2019)

Godfred Agyemang Yeboah (2019 – present)

Managers 
 Johnson Smith, 2017 – October 2019

 Evans Adotey, April 2020 – present

Season 
2020–21 Karela United FC season

See also 

 Ghana Premier League
Medeama SC

References

External links
Official Site

Football clubs in Ghana
Sports clubs in Ghana
Association football clubs established in 2013
2013 establishments in Ghana
Karela United FC